Bernadette Dupont (born 6 December 1936) is a French politician and a member of the Senate of France. She represents the Yvelines department and is a member of the Union for a Popular Movement Party.

References
Page on the Senate website

1936 births
Living people
French Senators of the Fifth Republic
Union for a Popular Movement politicians
Women members of the Senate (France)
21st-century French women politicians
Senators of Yvelines